The 2016–17 Auburn Tigers men's basketball team represented Auburn University during the 2016–17 NCAA Division I men's basketball season. The team's head coach was Bruce Pearl, in his third season at Auburn. The team played their home games at the Auburn Arena in Auburn, Alabama as a member of the Southeastern Conference. They finished the season 18–14, 7–11 in SEC play to finish in 11th place. They lost in the first round of the SEC tournament to Missouri.

Previous season 
The Tigers finished the season 11–20, 5–13 in SEC play to finish in 13th place. They lost to Tennessee in the first round of the SEC tournament.

Departures

Incoming Transfers

Recruits

Future recruits

2017–18 team recruits

Roster

Schedule and results

|-
!colspan=9 style="background:#172240; color:white;"| Exhibition

|-
!colspan=9 style="background:#172240; color:white;"| Regular season

|-
!colspan=9 style="background:#172240; color:white;" | SEC Tournament

References

Auburn Tigers men's basketball seasons
Auburn
Auburn
Auburn